The John A. Delaney Student Union is the student activity center at the University of North Florida (UNF) in Jacksonville, Florida, U.S. The first such building in UNF's history, it opened in 2009. It is located on the university's campus across from UNF Arena. The Student Union has been awarded several architectural awards, including the AIA Jacksonville Best Education Building in Florida award (2012), fourth place in AIA Florida's Best Building in Florida in 100 Years rankings (2012), and the AIA Jacksonville Design Award of Merit (2010). It was named in 2018 for former UNF president John A. Delaney.

History
Opened in 2009, the Student Union is the first in the university's history. It succeeds the Robinson Student Life Center as the main recreational facility on campus, but the Robinson Center only included a fraction of the amenities of the current Student Union. Plans for a Student Union go back as far as the 1980s, but the project was finalized in 2007. The Student Union is a central part of UNF's 2006 announcement to spend $170 million on new structures on campus including new housing, a College of Education building, and parking.

In 2018, the facility was named the John A. Delaney Student Union, after John A. Delaney. Delaney, who retired on May 31, 2018, had served as president of the school for 15 years.

Details

The facility cost $50.4 million.
The Coxwell Amphitheater has a capacity of 6,000 people.
First Leadership in Energy and Environmental Design (LEED) certified student union in Florida.

Features
UNF's Student Union consists of two buildings connected by a covered walkway known as Osprey Plaza. The structure includes contains the UNF bookstore, a convenience store, restaurants, a game room, an auditorium, a ballroom, Community First bank branch, an LGBT Resource Center, and an amphitheater. UNF student government is housed there, as is the Spinnaker Media, which includes UNF's student newspaper The Spinnaker, Spinnaker Television, and Spinnaker Radio. The Lufrano Intercultural Gallery of Art and other various student organizations like Fraternity and Sorority Life have their offices in the facility. The Boathouse restaurant is the third variant of the UNF tradition. The food court has an Einstein Bros, Panda Express, and Slice Pizzeria. Market Days are held each Wednesday from 10am-2pm in Osprey Plaza and features vendors from the region.

References

External links

Osprey Plaza Paver Project
Design Website
Dining Information

Student activity centers in the United States
Leadership in Energy and Environmental Design certified buildings
University of North Florida